Glen Robbins (13 July 1912 – 22 January 1992) was a Canadian cyclist. He competed in three events at the 1932 Summer Olympics.

References

External links
 
 1932 Olympic Cyclists at Greater Victoria Sports Hall of Fame

1912 births
1992 deaths
Canadian male cyclists
Olympic cyclists of Canada
Cyclists at the 1932 Summer Olympics
Sportspeople from Victoria, British Columbia